The 2013–14 season was Valencia Club de Fútbol's 96th in existence and the club's 27th consecutive season in the top flight of Spanish football.

Valencia endured its worst domestic season since 2007–08, following a serious hamstring injury to star goalkeeper Diego Alves. Contrary to the previous four seasons under the guidance of Unai Emery, Mauricio Pellegrino, Ernesto Valverde and Miroslav Đukić, Valencia's offence malfunctioned, and in December, Đukić was fired by the club, with successful former San Lorenzo coach Juan Antonio Pizzi taking over.

With Pizzi at the helm, Valencia managed to salvage some respectability by reaching the semi-finals of the UEFA Europa League, where they were eliminated by eventual champions Sevilla. Following that narrow defeat, Valencia failed to qualify to Europe for the next season for the first time since 1997–98 due to a lowly eighth-place finish in La Liga. In June 2014, the club was sold to Singaporean consortium Peter Lim.

Season summary
Valencia continued its increasingly frustrating run without the league title, which was extended to ten years following a chaotic season. Coach Miroslav Đukić was fired when the side did not perform to the expected level, and the season saw a further two coaches (Nicolás Estévez and Juan Antonio Pizzi) trying to lead Valencia without much success. Under Pizzi's reign, Valencia recorded a surprise 3–2 victory over Barcelona at Camp Nou in February and a 2–2 draw against Real Madrid at the Santiago Bernabéu Stadium in May. Despite the chaos, the side managed to reach the semi-finals of the UEFA Europa League, where it lost to eventual champions Sevilla.

Another worry was the injury problems affecting goalkeeper Diego Alves, who only played in 26 of the 38 league matches.

After the season, Valencia signed Rodrigo De Paul from Racing Club for a fee of €4.6 million to help out with the goalscoring, while successful ex-Rio Ave coach Nuno Espírito Santo was appointed in the hope he could help Valencia return to winning ways. José Sevilla Álvarez, owner of Bankia, sold the club to Singaporean Peter Lim to help Valencia clear its debt.

Players

The numbers are established according to the official website: www.valenciacf.com

From Valencia Mestalla

Out on loan

Detailed squad information

Transfers

In

Out

Club

Technical staff

Competitions

Overall

Overall friendly trophies

La Liga

League table

Matches

Copa del Rey

Valencia began in the last 32, beating Segunda División B side Gimnàstic de Tarragona before losing to Atlético Madrid in the last 16.

UEFA Europa League

Group stage

Knockout phase

Pre-season and friendlies
Valencia began training on 8 July 2013. The stage of pre-season was in Speyer, Germany, from Wednesday 10 July until Sunday 21 July, all players were invited and Mestalla members invited were Fede Cartabia, Mario Arqués, Salva Ruiz, José Luis Gayà and Robert. Players joining days later included Ricardo Costa, João Pereira, Adil Rami and Jérémy Mathieu on 9 July; Paco Alcácer on 10 July, Jonas, Éver Banega and Sofiane Feghouli on 13 July; Andrés Guardado, Juan Bernat and Gayà on 22 July; and Roberto Soldado on 27 July. Fernando Gago did not join the team. On 21 July, they returned to Valencia to participate in the International Champions Cup, which began in Valencia, then continued in the United States in August. Valencia presentations and the Orange Trophy were played on 10 August.

Statistics

Appearances and goals
Last updated on 17 May 2014

|-
! colspan=14 style=background:#dcdcdc; text-align:center|Goalkeepers

|-
! colspan=14 style=background:#dcdcdc; text-align:center|Defenders

|-
! colspan=14 style=background:#dcdcdc; text-align:center|Midfielders

|-
! colspan=14 style=background:#dcdcdc; text-align:center|Forwards

|-
! colspan=14 style=background:#dcdcdc; text-align:center| Players who have made an appearance or had a squad number this season but have been loaned out or transferred

|}

References

External links
 Official website 

Spanish football clubs 2013–14 season
2013-14
2013–14 UEFA Europa League participants seasons